Fred Derek Grove Palmer (1907 – 6 September 2001) was a British businessman from Faversham, Kent in the import/export trade resident in Chile.

Philately
In his spare time, Palmer was a philatelist, who was added to the Roll of Distinguished Philatelists in 1977. He won a medal for his display "War of the Pacific" at Philympia 1970.

References

1907 births
2001 deaths
Signatories to the Roll of Distinguished Philatelists
British philatelists
Fellows of the Royal Philatelic Society London
People from Faversham
British emigrants to Chile